Georgia Byng (born 6 September 1965) is a British children's writer, educator, illustrator, actress and film producer. Since 1995 she has published thirteen children’s books, and co-written and co-produced one film. Byng has won The Stockton Children’s Book Award, The Sheffield Children’s Book Award, The Massachusetts Children’s Book Award, The Salford Children’s Book Award and The Best Kid’s Film at The Peace And Love Festival, Sweden. Most of Byng’s works are magical realism adventures, with protagonists who overcome self-doubt and become self-empowered. The themes in Byng’s books are often bullying and its darkness, kindness and its light, friendship and its warmth, and the power of the mind.

Early life
Georgia Byng was born on 6 September 1965, in London, England. She grew up in a village, Abbots Worthy, near the city of Winchester in Hampshire. She has three brothers and one sister. She is the elder daughter and second child of Thomas Edmund Byng, the eighth Earl of Strafford and his first wife, Jennifer May (daughter of Irish politician William Morrison May). Byng is the elder sister of Jamie Byng, publisher of Canongate Books. Through her late stepfather, Sir Christopher Bland, Byng is the half-sister of Archie Bland, Guardian writer and sub-editor.

Byng was educated at Prince's Mead School, in Kings Worthy, Winchester, Nethercliffe School, Winchester then from 12 years old at Westonbirt School, an independent boarding school for girls in Gloucestershire. She went to Peter Symonds, a sixth form college in Winchester. From 1984 - 1987 she attended the Central School of Speech and Drama, a constituent college of the University of London in central London.

Byng was educated at Princess Mead School, Winchester, Nethercliffe School, Winchester then from 12 years old at Westonbirt School, an independent boarding school for girls in Gloucestershire. She went to Peter Symonds, a sixth form college in Winchester. From 1984 - 1987 she attended the Central School of Speech and Drama, a constituent college of the University of London in central London.

Career

Acting
Byng worked as an actress from 1989 to 1990, appearing in the television series Screen Two, Dealers, and Capstick's Law.

Writing and illustration
Byng's first published book was a comic-strip story that she wrote and illustraited – The Sock Monsters, about the small monsters who live in houses and eat people’s socks. She followed this with Jack’s Tree, a comic-strip book about a boy who saves a tree from being cut down. Next was The Ramsbottom Rumble, a short novel about two boys who save their grandmother from a con man. 

Byng's best-known work is Molly Moon's Incredible Book of Hypnotism, a children’s novel about a girl who finds a hypnotism book in the library and learns how to hypnotise people. This book was followed by Molly Moon’s Hypnotic Holiday, then Molly Moon Stops the World in which Molly learns how to stop time. In the following book, Molly Moon’s Time Travel Adventure, Molly gets the gist of time travelling. In Molly Moon, Micky Minus and the Mind Machine she becomes a mind reader. In Molly Moon and the Morphing Mystery Molly uses her powers to morph into other forms, both people and animals. In the seventh Molly Moon book, Molly Moon and The Monster Music, Molly finds she is able to hypnotise people and animals by playing hypnotic music. Each of the Molly Moon series is set in a different place, from the UK to New York, to Los Angeles, then India (this one in the nineteenth century as it is time travel) to Switzerland in the future to Ecuador and Japan. Byng co-wrote the screenplay for Molly Moon and the Incredible Book of Hypnotism, the movie of her first book. 

After the Molly Moon books came Pancake Face, and The Girl with No Nose. And in January 2023, Albi, the Glowing Cow Boy, an illustrated novel for 8 - 12 year olds about a calf who eats big white milk mushrooms, then becomes super-intelligent and escapes an abattoir. Like Byng’s other books this book travels across the world. Its protagonist, Albi champions compassion towards other beings and plant-based eating and this being a solution to climate change. Byng is with Caradoc King at London literary agency United Agents.

Production
In 2015, Byng was the producer for Molly Moon and the Incredible Book of Hypnotism, the film adaptation of her book.

Personal life
Byng married Daniel Chadwick in 1990; they divorced in 1995. They have a daughter from this marriage.

Byng married artist Marc Quinn. She has two more children with him; sons, Lucas (born 2001) and Sky (born 2005). They divorced in 2014.

She is engaged to the bass player Guy Pratt.

Publications
Selected works include:
The Sock Monsters (Orion Publishing Group, 1995)
Jack's Tree, illustrated by Lucy Su (A & C Black, 2000)
The Ramsbottom Rumble, illus. Helen Flook (Black, 2001)
Pancake Face, Illus. Mike Phillips (Barrington Stoke, 2014)
The Girl With No Nose, illus. Gary Blythe (Barrington Stoke, 2016)
Albi, The Glowing Cow Boy (UCLan Books, 2023)

Molly Moon series
Molly Moon's Incredible Book of Hypnotism (2002)
Molly Moon’s Hypnotic Holiday (2003)
Molly Moon Stops the World (2004)
Molly Moon's Hypnotic Time-Travel Adventure (2005)
Molly Moon, Micky Minus and the Mind Machine (2007)
Molly Moon and the Morphing Mystery (2010)
Molly Moon and the Monster Music (2012)

References

External links
The World of Molly Moon (Georgia Byng and Molly Moon Official)
Molly Moon series (official)
 Daily Telegraph article on Georgia Byng 28 January 2002 

1965 births
Place of birth missing (living people)
Alumni of the Royal Central School of Speech and Drama
British children's writers
British fantasy writers
Living people
People educated at Westonbirt School
Daughters of British earls
Georgia
English women novelists
Women science fiction and fantasy writers